Whitkirk may refer to:

 Whitkirk, Leeds, England, a suburb
 Ballywalter, County Down, Northern Ireland, a village

See also
 Whitekirk, East Lothian, Scotland, a village
 White Church (disambiguation)
 Whitchurch (disambiguation)